Yo Soy is a singing and impersonation competition show. It is the Peruvian version of the European show I am..., which has its own versions in other countries. It was presented by Adolfo Aguilar and Karen Schwarz up to starts of 2015. In the middle of 2015, it is presented with Cristian Rivero and Jesus Alzamora. It was produced by GV Producciones in 2012; in 2013, it is produced by Rayo en la botella. It is broadcast on Latina (Channel 2) and licensed by Endemol.

The jury is composed of producer Ricardo Morán, singer Maricarmen Marín and impersonator Fernando Armas. Since 2014, Katia Palma began to be part of the jury, replacing Armas some time later.

Format 
The program have three judges, who are responsible for selecting contestants based on their physical and vocal similarity to a given artist. The jury then chooses which participants remain and which leave.

The first prize is $25,000. In the last season of 2012 ("The Revenge"), the first prize was a Suzuki Grande Nomade.

Seasons

Great Famouses

References

External links
 
 

2010s Peruvian television series
2012 Peruvian television series debuts
Latina Televisión original programming